Douglas R. Roulstone (born January 11, 1950) is a former United States Navy officer. He served for two months in the Washington House of Representatives. A Republican, he was appointed on September 26, 2014, by Governor Jay Inslee to serve out the unexpired term of Mike Hope, who resigned in July. He was local Republican leaders' third choice for appointment to Hope's seat. He served until the certification of Mark Harmsworth as the winner of the November 4, 2014, general election, on November 25.

Roulstone is a retired Navy captain. He lives in Snohomish. He previously ran for the United States House of Representatives in 2006, losing to incumbent Democrat Rick Larsen. He was a candidate in the 44th Legislative District state senate race for 2018, garnering 44% of the vote against incumbent Democrat Steve Hobbs.

References

Living people
Republican Party members of the Washington House of Representatives
People from Snohomish, Washington
United States Navy officers
Place of birth missing (living people)
1950 births